Colonel Sir Reginald Hugh Dorman-Smith, GBE (10 March 1899 – 20 March 1977) was an Anglo-Irish diplomat, soldier and politician in the British Empire.

Early life and politics

Dorman-Smith was educated at Harrow School and the Royal Military College at Sandhurst. After serving in the army, he continued his career with a strong interest in agriculture, becoming president of the National Farmers Union (the NFU) at the age of 32, and then later Minister of Agriculture. He was first elected as a Member of Parliament (MP) for Petersfield in the 1935 general election as one of a handful of MPs sponsored by the NFU and served as the Union's president for the following few years.

In the late 1930s, the British Government's agricultural policy came in for heavy criticism from the NFU, Parliament and the Press and in January 1939 Prime Minister Neville Chamberlain took the bold step of appointing Dorman-Smith as Minister of Agriculture. In October 1940, Dorman-Smith instigated the Government's Dig for Victory campaign, aimed at increasing food production from allotments. However, when Chamberlain fell, Dorman-Smith was not included in the government of his successor, Winston Churchill.

Dorman-Smith was referred to in the book "Guilty Men" by Michael Foot, Frank Owen and Peter Howard (writing under the pseudonym 'Cato'), published in 1940 as an attack on public figures for their failure to re-arm and their appeasement of Nazi Germany.

Governor of Burma

Dorman-Smith was appointed Governor of Burma from 6 May 1941 to 31 August 1946, and was therefore in office at the time of the Japanese invasion - and was expelled from the country by the Japanese. Between May 1942 and Oct 1945, he was in exile at Simla, India. In October 1943, Dorman-Smith made a speech in London before the East Indian Association. His speech lamented the fact that while the British had talked for years about self-government and reform in Asia, they had delivered very little of it which had damaged their credibility. He said:

"Neither our word nor our intentions are trusted in that part of the globe ... We have fed such countries as Burma on political formulae until they are sick at the very sight and sound of a formula, which has come, as far as my experience shows, to be looked upon as a very British means of avoiding a definite course of action."

The speech said that pre-war British policy on these subjects was discredited and a new credible approach was required after the war.

Major-General Sir Hubert Rance, the British military commander, took control of the country for the military after the liberation of Rangoon, but Dorman-Smith returned as governor in 1946. Dorman-Smith considered arresting Aung San for a murder he committed in 1942. In that year, Aung San had stabbed the restrained headman of Thebyugone village to death in front of a large crowd. Dorman-Smith was convinced by his superiors not to carry out the arrest.

While Dorman-Smith was back in the UK for medical reasons he was replaced by Rance, who was supported by Lord Mountbatten of Burma and fully backed a policy of immediate unconditional independence for Burma under the leadership of the AFPFL.

Simla Conference 1944

As the Governor of Burma, Sir Reginald Dorman-Smith met with Anglo-Burmese leaders in Simla in 1944, to discuss the future of the Anglo-Burmese community after the war.

The Anglo-Burmese delegates were:

Mr. G. Kirkham
Mr. H.J. Mitchell B.Fr.S.
Mr. J. Barrington I.C.S.
Mr. K.W. Foster B.C.S.
Mr. E.A. Franklin I.C.S
Mr. W.A. Gibson
Mrs. K. Russell
Mr. H. Elliott
Mr. C.H. Campagnac
Mr. J.A. Wiseham
Mr. J.F. Blake

One result of the conference was an assurance to the Anglo-Burmese community that they would be allowed to preserve their freedom of worship and allowed to teach their own religion, freedom to continue their own customs, and maintain their own language of English.

After leaving Burma, Dorman-Smith continued to take an interest in its affairs. He believed that if London had not intervened, he could have influenced the course of events in Burma so as to prevent the country from leaving the British Commonwealth.

Family

Dorman-Smith was born to a Protestant Anglo-Irish 
father and an Irish Catholic mother at Bellamont House, Cootehill, County Cavan, Ireland, and was educated at Harrow and Sandhurst. He served briefly in the British Indian Army before being invalided out, then joined a volunteer battalion of the Queen's Royal Regiment.

One of Dorman-Smith's two brothers, Eric Dorman-Smith, was a major-general in the British Army in the Second World War. After falling out with the British establishment, he became an Irish republican sympathiser and changed his name to Eric Dorman O'Gowan. His other brother, Victor Dorman-Smith, was a Royal Navy captain who served as a member of Combined Operations HQ during World War One.

His daughter Patricia married the novelist Gwyn Griffin in 1950.

References

Further reading 
Taylor, Robert H. 'Sir Reginald Dorman-Smith'. In Southeast Asia: A Historical Encyclopedia from Angkor Wat to  East Timor. Santa Barbara, Ca.: ABC-Clio, 2004.

Woods, Philip. Reporting the Retreat: War Correspondents in Burma, 1942. London: Hurst & Co, 2016, esp. chs. 2 & 9.

External links 

 
 Burma's history - data website

1899 births
1977 deaths
Irish knights
Graduates of the Royal Military College, Sandhurst
Politicians from County Cavan
Conservative Party (UK) MPs for English constituencies
British Indian Army officers
Queen's Royal Regiment officers
People from Petersfield
Knights Grand Cross of the Order of the British Empire
Administrators in British Burma
UK MPs 1935–1945
People educated at Harrow School
Burma in World War II
Members of the Privy Council of the United Kingdom
Politicians awarded knighthoods
Ministers in the Chamberlain wartime government, 1939–1940
Ministers in the Chamberlain peacetime government, 1937–1939